The below list gives an overview of the contents and stories in the Yoga Vasistha, as it appears in Swami Venkatesananda's translation. The same stories are included in the Moksopaya, on which the Yoga Vasistha was based, as well.

In the beginning of the book Vasistha states that the stories have a "definite purpose and a limited intention. They are not to be taken literally, nor is their significance to be stretched beyond the intention."

Section One: On Dispassion

Section Two: On the Behavior of a Seeker
The Story of Śuka
Self Effort

Section Three: On Creation

The Story of Lila
The Story of Karkati 
The Story of the Sons of Indu 
The Story of Ahalya
The Story of the Great Forest 
The Story of the Three Non-Existent Princes
The Story of Lavana

Section Four: On Existence
The Story of Sukra
The Story of Dama, Vyala and Kata
The Story of Bhima, Bhasa and Drdha 
The Story of Dasura 
Kaca’s Story

Section Five: On Dissolution
The Story of King Janaka 
The Story of Punya and Pavana 
The Story of Bali 
The Story of Prahlada 
The Story of Gadhi 
The Story of Uddalaka 
The Story of Suraghu 
The Story of Bhasa and Vilasa 
The Story of Vitahavya

Section Six: On Liberation
Discourse on Brahman 
The Story of Bhusunda
Description of the Lord 
Deva Puja
The Story of the Wood-apple 
The Story of the Rock 
The Story of Arjuna 
The Story of the Hundred Rudra 
The Story of the Vampire 
The Story of Bhagiratha 
The Story of Sikhidvaja and Cudala
The Story of the Philosopher’s Stone 
The Story of the Foolish Elephant 
The Story of Kaca 
the Story of the Deluded Man 
The Story of Vipascit
The Story of the Hunter and the Sage
The World Within the Rock 
The Story of the Sage from Outer Space 
The Story of Bhrngisa
The Story of lksvaku
The Story of the Hunter and the Deer 
The Seven States of Yoga

References

Hindu texts
Sanskrit texts
Yoga Vasistha